Germaul Barnes was born June 2, 1971 in Phoenix, Arizona where he studied at The Center of Performing Arts at South Mountain High School, Phoenix School of Ballet and Ballet Arizona. Currently living in Brooklyn, New York and is the founder and artistic director of Viewsic Dance, a dance organization dedicated to the development of local and international contemporary dancers. He continued his dance training at the University of the Arts-Philadelphia.  In the early part of his career, he performed with Bill T. Jones/Arine Zane Dance Company where he received the 2003 BESSIES -New York and Performance Award, Cleo Parker Robinson Dance Ensemble, Jose Tmim, Movement Source Dance Company, Group Motions Dance Company, Pacific Conservatory Theatre and as guest performer with numerous ballet and contemporary dance company worldwide. He formed Viewsic Dance-VD (formerly Viewsic Expressions) in 1993 and has since created over 50 works for this project-by-project company.

He has become an internationally recognizable presence in the American contemporary dance scene. Noted for his visual wizardry and sonic imagination, he has been describe as “he came to resemble a martyr” (New York Times). As Director of VD his work has been seen at Central Park Summer Stage, Institute of Contemporary Arts/Boston, and The Kumble Theater for the Performance Arts and the International Dance Theater in Lublin, Poland, and Kulturhuset in Stockholm, Sweden and The Yakub Kolas National Academic Drama Theatre in Vitebsk, Russia. Recently, he choreographed Marley - the first original musical based on both the life and music of Bob Marley. “Germaul Barnes is saluted for the great choreography” (Broadway World). Barnes also works extensively in opera, television and films directing and choreographing productions for the South African composer Bongani Ndodana, Time Warren Cable, Alvin Ailey/Fordham, DanceImmersions, Joffery Ballet Jazz & Contemporary Intensive, Burt Sugar/Danz, UNCG, Finding Her Light, Pile On! and Fall to Rise, among others.

As Collaborations is a strong component to Barnes creative process he has worked with such artists as Thollem McDonas, Russian National Wind Quintet, Cameron Carpenter, Gabri Christa, Greg Tate, Paul Sullivan, Harry Feiner, Calvin Wiley, Peter McMath, Maxim Rubtsov and Whitney V. Hunter.

He as taught at the University of Illinois at Champaign-Urbana, Belarus International Modern Dance Festival, Boroditski Denis Dance Camp, Dance Immersions, National Theater of Ghana, Lublin International Dance Festival, Joffery Ballet Jazz & Contemporary Intensive, Restorations Plaza Youth Arts Academy and Dance Olympus.

Barnes is a member of the INTERNATIONAL ASSOCIATION OF BLACKS IN DANCE and serve as an Advisory Board Member and curator for the Thelma Hill Performance Arts Center. He currently holds the post as Associate Artistic Director of ChoreoQuest Project. He has received Arts International Grant to support his anthropology study in Ghana, West Africa and The Phoenix Art Commission Award. One of his highest personal achievement is working closely with Katherine Dunham and Eleo Pomare.

Germaul has received critical acclaim for his work across the globe,
 including his choreography and performance in the 60x60 project's 60x60 Dance at the World Financial Center Winter Garden Atrium.

Articles
An Express Without Any Delays By ROSLYN SULCAS, New York Times, November 17, 2008

http://www.broadwayworld.com/washington-dc/article/BWW-Reviews-MARLEY-at-Center-Stage-From-Mozart-to-MARLEYWhat-a-Season-20150528#

References

External links 
Viewsic Expressions

Living people
American male dancers
Artists from Phoenix, Arizona
American choreographers
Year of birth missing (living people)